"God Save Us All (Death to POP)" is the eighth track on Canadian rock band Sum 41's album 13 Voices, and was released on September 29, 2016.

Music video
The release of the single was accompanied by a live music video, directed by Blake Primes, with footage filmed on the band's 2016 European summer tour and the 2016 Vans Warped Tour, beginning with lead singer and rhythm guitarist Deryck Whibley stating that:

References

2016 songs
2016 singles
Sum 41 songs
Songs written by Deryck Whibley
Hopeless Records singles